The 1997–98 Divizia A was the eightieth season of Divizia A, the top-level football league of Romania.

Teams

League table

Positions by round

Results

Top goalscorers

Champion squad

References

Liga I seasons
Romania
1997–98 in Romanian football